"Solar Sister" is a song by the American alternative rock band The Posies, released as the second single released from its album Frosting on the Beater in 1993.

Lyrics
The song mentions the book Sister Carrie by American novelist Theodore Dreiser.

Track listing

"Solar Sister"
"Ever Since I Was Alone" (demo version)
"Start a Life"

Notes
"Ever Since I Was Alone" is from the "Dream All Day" single and "Start a Life" is from the UK "Flavor of the Month" single.

References

1993 singles
Songs written by Ken Stringfellow
Songs written by Jon Auer
1993 songs
DGC Records singles
The Posies songs